The 2012 United States presidential election in Nevada took place on November 6, 2012, as part of the 2012 United States presidential election in which all 50 states plus the District of Columbia participated. State voters chose six electors to represent them in the Electoral College via a popular vote pitting incumbent Democratic President Barack Obama and his running mate, Vice President Joe Biden, against Republican challenger and former Massachusetts Governor Mitt Romney and his running mate, Congressman Paul Ryan.

Nevada was won by President Barack Obama with 52.36% of the vote to Mitt Romney's 45.68%, a 6.68% margin of victory. In 2008, Obama won the state by 12.49%. Nevada has voted for the winner in every presidential election from 1912 onwards, except in 1976 when it voted for Gerald Ford over Jimmy Carter and in 2016 when it voted for Hillary Clinton over Donald Trump. Carson City, which voted for Obama in 2008, flipped to supporting the Republican Party this election cycle. Despite only winning two counties (Clark and Washoe), these counties consist of over 87% of Nevada's population and are home to Las Vegas and Reno, the largest and third largest cities in the state, thus allowing Obama to win by a comfortable margin. This is the most recent presidential election in which Nevada voted to the right of Wisconsin, as well as to the left of Colorado or Virginia.

Caucuses

Democratic
Incumbent President Barack Obama was not challenged for the Democratic candidacy so no Democratic Primary was held.

Republican

The Republican caucuses were held on February 4 and they are closed caucuses, Mitt Romney was declared the winner.

There are 400,310 registered Republicans voting for 28 delegates.

Date
The 2012 Nevada Republican caucuses were originally scheduled to begin on February 18, 2012, much later than the date in 2008, which almost immediately followed the beginning of the year in January 2008. On September 29, 2011, the entire schedule of caucuses and primaries was disrupted, however, when it was announced that the Republican Party of Florida had decided to move up its primary to January 31, in an attempt to bring attention to its own primary contest, and attract the presidential candidates to visit the state. Because of the move, the Republican National Committee decided to strip Florida of half of its delegates. Also as a result, the Nevada Republican Party, along with Iowa, New Hampshire and South Carolina, then sought to move their caucuses back into early January. All but Nevada, who agreed to follow Florida, confirmed their caucus and primary dates to take place throughout January, with Nevada deciding to hold their contest on February 4, 2012.

The caucuses for 1,835 precincts in 125 sites were scheduled: voting from 9 AM - 1 PM, ballots handling 9-10 AM and to conclude by 3 PM at the latest on February 4, with results for almost all counties to be announced by the party at 5 PM.

Clark County
For Clark County, a special caucus was held at the Adelson Educational Campus at 7 PM, intended to accommodate those who observe Saturday Sabbath. According to Philip Kantor, an Orthodox Jew, the goal of the after-work caucus was to prevent electoral fraud "It has everything to do with not being deprived of a vote, being disenfranchised". This late caucus allowed a timely vote for Seventh-day Adventists, Orthodox Jews and other who don't vote until Sabbath is over. Adelson campus caucus attendees were required to sign affidavits stating that they had not already cast their ballot in an earlier caucus, that day. There was only one nationwide televised (by CNN) public vote-count. That Adelson caucus count provided the following Candidate vote results: Ron Paul 181, Mitt Romney 61, Newt Gingrich 57, and Rick Santorum 16 votes. The results of this special caucus were announced Feb 4 near 11 PM. Paul got second place in Clark County, but Gingrich was ahead of Paul by a larger margin in the rest of the state and therefore ended up beating Paul statewide for second place.

Polling

Results
Turnout was 8.23%.  1,800 of 1,800 precincts (100%) reporting.  The voting-eligible population (400,310 registered Nevada Republicans).   125 caucus sites.

Delegates were awarded to candidates who got 3.57% or more of the vote proportionally

This final result was announced by Twitter and the Nevada Republican Party on Monday February 6, at 01:01 am PST (local time).
The actual Republican National Convention delegates from Nevada are mostly Ron Paul supporters (22 of 28), which were elected by state convention on May 6. The Nevada Republican Party's rules state that most elected delegates to the RNC are still bound to vote for Romney (in the first round of voting), because of Romney's statewide caucuses winning.

Controversy
Allegations of voter fraud have arisen due to a recount of Clark County ballots despite there being no official contest from any of the campaigns. One reason given by the GOP was that there were more ballots cast than people "signed in" at some precincts.

General election

Candidate ballot access
 Mitt Romney/Paul Ryan, Republican
 Barack Obama/Joseph Biden, Democratic
 Gary Johnson/James P. Gray, Libertarian
 Virgil Goode/Jim Clymer, Constitution

Polling
Throughout the race, Barack Obama tied or won every single pre-election poll except one. The final poll showed Obama leading 51% to 47%, while the average of the last 3 polls showed Obama leading Romney 50% to 47%.

Results

By county

Counties and independent cities that flipped from Democratic to Republican 
 Carson City

Results by congressional districts
Obama won 3 of 4 congressional districts, including one that elected a Republican.

Analysis
Nevada has historically been a swing state.  It has voted for the winner of every presidential election since 1912, except for 1976 and 2016. From 1992 to 2004, the margin of victory was always under five points. In 2008, however, the state swung over dramatically to support Obama, who carried it by 12.49%.

In 2012, Obama held onto Nevada, though by a narrower margin of 6.68%. This was due almost entirely to Obama carrying the state's two largest counties–Clark County, home to Las Vegas and Henderson, and Washoe County, home to Reno. These two counties account for 85% of Nevada's population. Romney dominated the state's rural counties, which have supported Republicans for decades. However, the only large jurisdiction he carried was the independent city of Carson City.

As in 2008, Obama owed his victory in part to the state's Hispanic voters breaking heavily for him.  According to exit polls, Hispanics made up 19% of the electorate and voted for Obama by almost three-to-one.

See also
 2012 Republican Party presidential debates and forums
 2012 Republican Party presidential primaries
 Results of the 2012 Republican Party presidential primaries
 United States presidential elections in Nevada
 Nevada Republican Party

References

External links
Official website of Nevada's Secretary of State's office
Official website of the Nevada Republican Party
CNN entrance polls of caucus attendants
The Green Papers: for Nevada
The Green Papers: Major state elections in chronological order

Nevada
United States president
2012
Nevada caucuses